Toivola is an unincorporated community in Toivola Township, Saint Louis County, Minnesota, United States.

The community is located near Meadowlands at the junction of Saint Louis County Highway 5 and County Road 52 (Arkola Road).

Sand Creek flows through the community.  The Saint Louis River is nearby.

References

 Rand McNally Road Atlas – 2007 edition – Minnesota entry
 Official State of Minnesota Highway Map – 2011/2012 edition

Unincorporated communities in Minnesota
Unincorporated communities in St. Louis County, Minnesota